Revengers Tragedy is a 2002 film adaptation of the 1606 play The Revenger's Tragedy (attributed to Thomas Middleton in the credits, following the scholarly consensus). It was directed by Alex Cox and adapted for the screen by Cox's fellow Liverpudlian, Frank Cottrell-Boyce. The film stars Christopher Eccleston as the revenge-obsessed Vindice, with Derek Jacobi as the evil Duke, Eddie Izzard as his lecherous son Lussurioso, Diana Quick as the Duchess, Andrew Schofield as Vindice's brother Carlo (a version of the play's Hippolito), Carla Henry as his virtuous sister Castiza, and Marc Warren and Justin Salinger as the Duchess's sons Supervacuo and Ambitioso.

Synopsis
The original play is set in a depraved Italian court, but Cottrell Boyce's screenplay relocates it to a futuristic version of Liverpool in the year 2011, following the aftermath of a natural disaster which has destroyed the southern half of Great Britain. The city is a dystopia in which society is collapsing and where vendettas and the crude exercise of power are the norm. Jacobi's Duke is the most powerful crime lord in the city. Cottrell Boyce's script rearranges the play heavily and mixes the original Jacobean language with modern language.

Production
Revengers Tragedy was shot and edited in Liverpool with an almost entirely local crew, including cinematographer Len Gowing, costumer Monica Aslanian, makeup designer Lesley Brennan and assistant director Kim Ryan. Cox's usual production designer, Cecilia Montiel prepared a visual strategy which was executed by her co-designer Remi Vaughan-Richards. The producers were Margaret Matheson (who executive produced Cox's Sid and Nancy for Zenith) and Tod Davies (Cox's wife, who also wrote and produced Cox's Three Businessmen).

The soundtrack of the same name was written and performed by Chumbawamba. In 2003, it was released by the band on their independent record label, MUTT.

Reception
The BBC's Jamie Russell gave the film 3/5 stars, stating "It exaggerates the play's confused identities, deliberate miscommunications, and sarcastic asides into an overblown exercise in outright camp." The review further states that the film's messages are "ultimately let down by the film's rough edges", and contains "moments that are painfully amateurish, "Revengers Tragedy" ultimately annoys as much as it exhilarates."
Varietys Deborah Young described the film as "ambitious, sometimes exhilarating but ultimately not very new attempt to unleash the power of great literature past by punking it up." The Time Out Film Guide commented: "The stylistic intention, presumably, was old meets new with a Luhrmann-like flourish, but the modest resources on display result in a look somewhere between threadbare Jarman and school play. One struggles to be impressed."

References

External links

Revengers Tragedy page on Alex Cox website

Films directed by Alex Cox
2002 films
2000s science fiction comedy-drama films
British science fiction comedy-drama films
2000s dystopian films
2000s English-language films
British films based on plays
Films set in 2011
Films set in Liverpool
Films set in the future
British post-apocalyptic films
Films with screenplays by Frank Cottrell-Boyce
2002 comedy films
2002 drama films
2000s British films